Clewer House School was a 19th-century grammar school in Clewer, Windsor, Berkshire for boys.

Clewer House was a manor house built c. 1795. In the early 1800s the house was occupied by John Ramsbottom (1778–1845), who served as MP for Windsor from 1810 to 1845 and moved to Old Windsor c. 1835.

The school was founded in 1839 by Rev. William Redford Harris, a magistrate in Windsor who became the town's mayor in 1864. The school had an excellent academic reputation for a number of decades but was closed down around the turn of the 19th century.

Notable alumni
Alfred Harker (1859–1939), geologist
Edward Albert Sharpey-Schafer (1850–1935), physiologist
Abe Bailey (1864-1940), South African politician and financier

References

Educational institutions established in 1839
Defunct schools in the Royal Borough of Windsor and Maidenhead
Defunct grammar schools in England
1839 establishments in England